Vladyslav Vitaliyovych Pavlenko (born 5 April 1994) is a Ukrainian professional footballer who plays as a midfielder for Rubikon Kyiv.

Career
Pavlenko made his debut for Tavriya Simferopol played in the main-squad team against Karpaty Lviv on 3 March 2013 in Ukrainian Premier League.

References

External links
 
 
 

1994 births
Living people
People from Nikopol, Ukraine
Ukrainian footballers
Association football midfielders
Ukraine youth international footballers
Ukraine under-21 international footballers
SC Tavriya Simferopol players
FC Hoverla Uzhhorod players
FC Vitebsk players
Navbahor Namangan players
FK Mash'al Mubarek players
Surkhon Termez players
FC Nikopol players
FC Uzhhorod players
Speranța Nisporeni players
FC Lyubomyr Stavyshche players
FC Rubikon Kyiv players
FC Zvyahel Novohrad-Volynskyi players
Ukrainian Premier League players
Ukrainian Second League players
Belarusian Premier League players
Uzbekistan Super League players
Armenian First League players
Moldovan Super Liga players
Ukrainian expatriate footballers
Expatriate footballers in Belarus
Expatriate footballers in Uzbekistan
Expatriate footballers in Armenia
Expatriate footballers in Moldova
Ukrainian expatriate sportspeople in Belarus
Ukrainian expatriate sportspeople in Uzbekistan
Ukrainian expatriate sportspeople in Armenia
Ukrainian expatriate sportspeople in Moldova
Sportspeople from Dnipropetrovsk Oblast